Philip Francis Flanagan (December 15, 1909 – October 7, 1987) was an American football guard. He was the 81st and last selection in the 1936 NFL Draft.

Life 
Flanagan was born on December 15, 1909, in Clinton, Massachusetts.

School

High School 
He attended high school at Clinton High School before playing college football at Holy Cross.

College 
He spent 1932 to 1935 at Holy Cross, playing from 1933 to 1935.

Injury 
In summer of 1935, Flanagan had an infected tooth that infected a gland. He was hospitalized for six weeks, being told that his football career was over. The Worcester Telegram said that he "returned to college and surprised everyone by reporting for the football team." It also stated that "At the time of his return to college Flanagan was scarcely able to open his mouth and was forced to live on liquids for some time."

Post-Injury 
He later played well enough to be named the team's starting guard, and was named to the College Football All-America Team following the 1935 season. He also earned a position on the college football all-East team.  He would later then be inducted into the Holy Cross Athletics Hall of Fame in 1974.

Football

NFL 
After the season, he was the final selection in the inaugural 1936 NFL Draft by the New York Giants.

AFL 
Instead of playing with the Giants, Phil decided to join the Boston Shamrocks of the American Football League (AFL). With Boston he appeared in two games. It would be the only games of his career.

Death 
Flanagan died on October 7, 1987, in Northampton, Massachusetts, at the age of 77.

References

1909 births
1987 deaths
American football guards
Holy Cross Crusaders football players
New York Giants players
Boston Shamrocks (AFL) players
People from Clinton, Massachusetts